Caught in the Net is a 2020 Czech documentary film by Vít Klusák about sexual predators on the internet. The film documents three actresses pretending to be adolescent girls on social media who are contacted by sexual predators that try to seduce them and start sending them photos of their genitalia. Sexual predators appearing in the film attracted focus of police after the release of the film and at least one of them was convicted at the court. The film was crowdfunded through HitHit during which filmmakers raised 3 million Czech koruna. The film was named Best Documentary of 2020 at the 2021 Czech Lion Awards.

Cast
Tereza Těžká
Anežka Pithartová
Sabina Dlouhá
Vít Klusák

Release
The film released on 27 February 2020 and quickly became the best grossing Czech documentary film. An edited version for schools was released under name Caught in the Net: Behind School. An uncensored version called Caught in the Net 18+ premiered on 9 July 2020. One of the sexual predators contacted a lawyer in an attempt to prevent release of the uncensored version.

References

External links
 
 

2020 films
Czech documentary films
2020 documentary films
Czech Lion Awards winners (films)
2020s Czech-language films